Chicama Valley is an area located at north of the Valley of Moche in La Libertad Region, northern Peru, it has agricultural resources where one of the main products is cane of sugar; this valley has been formed on both sides of the Chicama River.

Description

Mainly It is an agricultural zone that is part of the project Chavimochic in its third stage.

Interesting places
Some interesting places in the valley are:

Ascope
Puerto Chicama
Casas_Grandes
Cascas
El Brujo
Huaca Prieta

See also
Trujillo
Valley of Moche
Viru Valley
Chao Valley

External links

References

Valleys of La Libertad Region